Austin Bisnow (born June 9, 1987), is an American musician, songwriter, record producer, and lead singer of the band Magic Giant. He has written and produced songs for artists such as David Guetta feat. John Legend ("Listen"), Big Time Rush (“Like Nobody’s Around”), Jon Batiste & Stay Human (“Express Yourself”), Steve Aoki & Moxie Raia ("I Love It When You Cry"), and Paul Oakenfold (“Who Do You Love”), where he was also the featured artist. In addition, Bisnow has collaborated with Akon, Aloe Blacc, Diplo, will.i.am, American Authors, Cody Simpson, Adam Levine, Gym Class Heroes, Benny Blanco, Mike Posner, Claude Kelly, Beast, Sammy Adams, and Cisco Adler.

Early life
Bisnow grew up in Washington, D.C. and is the brother of Elliott Bisnow, best known for being the founder and CEO of Summit. Summit helped Austin co-found the organization Get Well Soon Tour. Austin is the son of author Margot Machol and media entrepreneur Mark Bisnow.
Bisnow attended the University of Colorado Boulder, playing back-up long snapper for the Buffaloes and majoring in Music Composition.

Career
Bisnow is a writer, producer and pianist on the title track of David Guetta’s 2014 album Listen. The album went No. 1 on Billboard's Dance Electronic Chart the day it was released, reached No. 4 on the Billboard 200 making it Guetta's highest charting album in the US, and has gone No. 1 in over 50 countries worldwide. 
Bisnow has two additional #1s on the Billboard charts for his work as a writer and producer on the Jon Batiste & Stay Human single, “Express Yourself” and on the Nickelodeon Boy Band, Big Time Rush single, “Like Nobody’s Around", which saw its music video premiere on Vevo during the 2013 Kids' Choice Awards. According to Vanity Fair, Batiste & Stay Human's "stirring" performance of "Express Yourself" on The Colbert Report in 2014 must be connected with Colbert's decision to name Batiste as the bandleader on his new iteration of The Late Show. In June 2015, Bisnow's work with K-pop group, Beast achieved 1st place on the daily Oricon Singles Chart (Japan's equivalent to US Billboard Hot 100). Bisnow also co-wrote the lead single "I Love It When You Cry (Moxoki)" off Steve Aoki's 2015 release, Neon Future II.

As a solo artist, Bisnow was featured on electronic music DJ Paul Oakenfold’s 2013 single, “Who Do You Love” which Bisnow also penned and performed on stage with Oakenfold in both Hollywood and Vancouver.

As a musician, Bisnow played Fender Rhodes on the Billboard No. 1 (US Mainstream Top 40) Gym Class Heroes’ “Stereo Hearts" feat. Adam Levine” and organ on Cisco Adler’s “Classic” as well as the remix featuring Sammy Adams.

MAGIC GIANT
In early 2014, Bisnow formed the Indie folk band MAGIC GIANT. Its singles "Set On Fire" charted top 30 on Billboard's Alternative chart, #1 on KROQ's Locals Only and #4 on Spotify's US Viral 50 while its single, "Window" charted top 40 on Billboard's Hot AC and Adult Pop charts.

The band appeared on ABC's Good Morning America and NBC's Today show with Hoda Kotb and Kathie Lee Gifford as Elvis Duran's Artist of the Month, where they performed live their hit "Set on Fire". The group was chosen as ALT 98.7's Artist in Residence and named by Rolling Stone as one of 10 New Artists You Need to Know.

The group has played festivals such as Coachella, BottleRock, Firefly, Electric Forest, and Lightning in a Bottle and toured with artists such as Mike Posner, The Revivalists, American Authors, Beats Antique, Eric Hutchinson, and Atlas Genius.

Get Well Soon Tour
In 2011, Bisnow teamed up with Grammy Award-winning producer Benny Blanco to create the non-profit Get Well Soon Tour, which aims to bring joy to children in hospitals through surprise visits from superstar musicians around the US. Since their first visit with Justin Bieber on Valentine's Day, 2011, the “tour” has brought artists like Bruno Mars, Pitbull, Britney Spears, John Legend, Selena Gomez, Diplo, Robin Thicke, FUN., and Maroon 5. In 2013, Get Well Soon Tour got several patients backstage access at The Grammys to meet The Black Keys, B.O.B. and Miranda Lambert.

References

External links
 MAGIC GIANT: Official site

Living people
1987 births
American male singer-songwriters
Record producers from Washington, D.C.
American electronic musicians
American multi-instrumentalists
21st-century American male singers
21st-century American singers
Singer-songwriters from Washington, D.C.